Károly Salbeck of Petris (Galați Moldova, today Romania 17 November 1725 – Lőcse, Hungary (today part of Slovakia, 15 June 1787) was a doctor of theology, bishop of Szepes County, brother of Ferenc Salbeck and Mihály Salbeck.

His life
He was one of the sons of Máté Salbeck, a salt trader. He studied at the Collegium Hungaricum in Rome, and became a priest at the Diocese of Transylvania. Between 1751 and 1776 he was canon of Kalocsa, abbot of Ercsi, bishop of Nemeia and provost of Vác. Between 1776 and 1787 he was the first bishop of Szepes and privy councillor to the  Order of Saint Stephen.

His works
 Sermo sacer ... habitus Jaurini die XV. Aug. 1774. in alteris sacerdotii soleniis exc., ill, ac. rev. dni Francisci e com. Zichy de Vásonkő episcopi Jaurinensi. Vacii.

Sources
 
 PIM

18th-century Hungarian people
Hungarian Christians
People from Galați
1725 births
1787 deaths